José Luis Martínez (8 November 1926 – 8 January 2014) was a Spanish sports shooter. He competed in the skeet event at the 1968 Summer Olympics.

References

1926 births
2014 deaths
Spanish male sport shooters
Olympic shooters of Spain
Shooters at the 1968 Summer Olympics
Sportspeople from San Sebastián
20th-century Spanish people